Khwaja Muhammad Tahir Bakhshi Naqshbandi, born 1963), also known as Sajjan Saeen, is a prominent Naqshbandi Sufi shaykh in Pakistan. He was born on March 21, 1963, at dargah Rahmatpur Sharif, district Larkana, Pakistan. He is successor to Khwaja Allah Bakhsh Rah, also known as Sohna Saeen, whose lineage goes to Khwaja Ghareeb Nawaz Fazal Ali Shah Qureshi. His followers and partisans are all over Pakistan and in countries such as the United Kingdom, Germany, Sweden, Spain, Australia, New Zealand, Sri Lanka, UAE, Canada and USA.

He is patron-in-chief of Jamaat Islah-ul-Muslimeen, Rohani Talaba Jamaat and Jamiyat-e-Ulema Tahiriya. He has more than 300 deputies (Khulafa') who are dedicated to spread the Naqshbandi message across the world.

Early life
The shaykh was born on 21 march, 1963 at dargah Rahmatpur sharif, in district Larkana, Sindh Pakistan. As per the Islamic principles, his grandsheikh Khwaja Muhammad Abdul Ghaffar said the Azan and Iqamat in his ears at birth, since his father was out of station for Tabligh (preaching). His name was also suggested by his grandsheikh, which was happily accepted by his parents. Pir Mitha died on December 12, 1964. He was under two  years of age that his parents migrated from Rahmatpur sharif to another village in Dadu district in January 1965. In April 1965, his father Khwaja Allah Bakhsh established a new village and center for peaching called Faqeerpur sharif, near Radhan Station in Dadu district. There, he passed his childhood while the center was being established. Later, his parents migrated to the new and current center Allahabad sharif situated in district Naushehro-Feroz, and resides there since then.

Education
His education started from Dargah Faqeer Pur Shareef near Radhan City, District Dadu, Pakistan where he got primary education and nazra Quran. He learned Tajwid Quran when he was only 7 years old. He learned Persian, Arabic and Hadith from Madirsah Jamiya Arabiya Ghaffaria, Dargah Allahabad Shareef, Kandiaro, Naushahro Feroze District, Pakistan. He finished advanced Arabic and Hadith education from Al-Markaz Qadriya Karachi. He studied with various teachers, some of them include Maulana Muntakhib-al-Haqq Qadri, Allama Yahya Siddiqi (History), Maulana Saeed-ur-Rahman (Adab), Abdul-Quddus Hashmi (comparative religions) and Mufti Mahmood Alwari. He received multiple Asnad of Hadith, and in one of these, his line goes to Shah Waliullah Dahlawi with only three intermediaries.

He graduated his Dars-i-Nizami from Madrasah Jamia Arabiya Ghaffaria in 1979. He is also a graduate in Islamic Studies from Sindh University, Pakistan.

Spiritual education
He received Ijazah of Naqshbandi tariqah from his father, Sheikh Sohna Saeen who was the chief caliph and successor of Abdul-Ghaffar Naqshbandi of Larkana, Sindh. His father trained him in the spiritual path of Naqshbandi Mujaddidi tariqah from the childhood, and permitted him to teach the tariqah to his followers. He received Ijazah three times from his father. Once he received Khilafat (syn. of Ijazah in tariqah) in 1397 A.H when he was still studying in madrasah. Second time he received Khilafat when his father was awarding Khilafat to another person Maulana Siddiq Ahmad Nasir. Third time he received Khilafat in 1403 A.H (the year his father died) along with Maulana Naseem Ahmed of Hyderabad.

During the last years of his father, he used to represent his father and presided various programs and gatherings where he initiated newcomers in the tariqah. His father used to send him in his place.

Succession
After the demise of Khwaja Allah Bakhsh Abbasi all the Islamic scholars, khalifas (spiritual representatives) and key persons of the organization unanimously agreed to nominate his son Khwaja Muhammad Tahir as successor. He is also known as Sajjan Saeen. On that day almost every follower took Oath of Allegiance on his hand except for a few who also took Oath of Allegiance later. Some of them had reported that Khwaja Allah Bakhsh came in their dream and advised them to take Oath. Some other had spiritual sightings of Muhammad who guided them to take the oath of allegiance with Shaikh Muhammad Tahir, as reported in the book Seerat Wali-e-Kamil.

His tariqah

Spiritual chain of succession

Shaikh Muhammad Tahir belongs to the Mujaddidi order of Sufism, which is the main branch of Naqshbandi Sufi tariqah. His spiritual lineage goes to Muhammad, through Shaikh Ahmad Sirhindi, the Mujaddid of eleventh Hijri century.

Sufi methodology
The Shaikh focuses on Qalbi Zikr (a method of remembering Allah by heart), which makes the base of his tariqah. He advises his murids or spiritual students to practice Muraqbah daily, which is a kind of meditation for the Qalbi Zikr. The collective Zikr or Muraqba is held daily after the Fajr prayer in all the centers of the organization. The shaikh himself leads the Muraqba at Dargah Allahabad sharif daily where he himself resides. This collective Muraqba is different from other branches of the Naqshbandi tariqah. While the murids will go into meditation by closing their eyes and sitting in a recommended position, the shaikh (or the one who leads the Muraqba) will recite some verses of the Quran and sing from the Sufi poetry, while making a sound from a Tasbih with large prayer beads. The sound is produced by striking the large stones of the Tasbih with each other while the Tasbih progresses, and is not rhythmic but continuous. This method was first practiced by Shaikh Ahmed Saeed Faruqi, the eighth Shaikh in the lineage of Shaikh Muhammad Tahir. Many other Sufi shaikhs have also been reported to have practiced this method, including Shaikhs from other tariqahs such as Qadri.

The purpose of this sound from the Tasbih, as described by the Shaikh, is that a person can tune his meditation of pronouncing Allah, Allah, Allah with the sound of the Tasbih, thus making it easier to practice the Zikr. Other Sufi orders have also practiced some form of external sound to help meditate and proclaim the words of Zikr. Most of the Sufi music falls into this very purpose, though later modified at large extent. But this sound of Tasbih does not produce any rhythm, since music is considered unlawful in Islamic Sharia hence making it illegal in the Mujaddidi Sufi order which is based on adhering to the rules of Sharia.

His message
His message is the same what has been of Sufi Saints. He focuses on the remembrance Allah in one's heart, love of Muhammad and all creations of Allah. In his speeches he always emphasizes on how to purify inner soul so that love of God can be achieved. He believes in interfaith harmony and people from different sects and religions join his gatherings.

In Pakistan, he has large number of followers. The annual Urs of his shaykh which is celebrated every year in November, is attended by more than two lac people (2016 estimate), and is one of the biggest religious gatherings in Pakistan. Outside Pakistan he has a large number of followers in UAE and considerable numbers in countries such as UK, Australia and South Africa. Some of his murids live in the US, Canada, parts of Europe, Saudi Arabia, China, Sri Lanka and some other countries, where they are actively engaged to spread his message of inter-faith harmony and love of God with Qalbi Dhikr.

Religious contribution

Books and publications
He has been writing on different topics of Islam such as Sufism, Zikr (Remembrance of Allah), Islamic law etc. All of his publications are in Urdu language. Some of them are listed below.

 Jalwagah-e-Dost (جلؤہ گاہ دوست):  This book discusses in detail about tasawuf, sufiism, zikr (remembrance of Allah) and quotations of Naqshbandi spiritual personalities.
 Tasawuf Kia Hay (تصوف کیا ہے؟): This book discusses the history of tasawuf and clarified some misconceptions about the subject.
 Rozay ki Haqeeqat (روزہ کی حقیقت): This book discusses the importance of fasting and its true spirit.
 Sahib-e-Khalq-e-Azeem (صاحبِ خلقِ عظیم): This book highlights the character of Muhammad
 Sahib-e-Ahl-e-Zikr ki Khidmat Main Chund Maarozaat (صاحبِ اہلِ ذکر حضرات کی خدمت میں چند معروضات): This book is guidance for everyone on how to reach Allah, keep distance from wrongdoing and its importance for the people who steps into tasawuf and submit themselves to one God.
 Haram Kamana aur Kahana Gunah-e-Kabeera Hai (حرام کمانا اور کھانا ایک گناہِ کبیرہ ہے): This book  details about the importance of halal and haram mostly with respect to earning money through right or wrong sources.
 Muhabbat ki Nishaniyan (محبت کی نشانیاں): This book highlights the significance and symptoms of divine love.
 Murshid-e-Kamil Murid-e-Sadiq ki Nazar Main (مرشدِ کامل مریدِ صادق کی نظر میں): This book explains in detail how much respect a true follower should give to his spiritual guide and how it is important in achieving spiritual goals and learning lessons.

Books written about him
A number of books have been published on his personality, his message and his teachings. Following are a few of them:

 Karamat Tahiriya: A book that contains some of the spiritual sightings and occurrences known in Islamic terminology as "Karamat" (literally meaning miracles). Written in Urdu, this book describes his spiritual powers, as narrated by others. It is written by Mawlana Muhammad Jameel Abbasi.
 Khitabat Tahiriya: His speeches in writing. This book contains twelve of his lectures delivered at various places.
 Khutbat Tahiriya (2nd volume): This book also contains his lectures in writing.
 Tuhfat-ut-Tahireen: Written by Bedar Morai, this book is mostly a travelogue of the author, detailing the travels with the Shaikh. Also contains some Karamat and other things.
 Malfoozat-e-Tahiria : Written by Bedar Morai.
 Maqalat-e-Tahiria : Written by Bedar Morai.
 Bostan-e-Tahiria : Written by Bedar Morai.
Haq

List of khanqahs (spiritual centers)

There are quite a large number of spiritual centers across Pakistan which are being administered by his caliphs (khulafas)under his spiritual supervision. Following are the main centers:
 Dargah Allahabad Shareef, Kandiaro, Naushahro Feroze District, Pakistan
 Dargah Faqeer Pur Shareef near Radhan City, District Dadu, Pakistan
 Dargah Tahirabad Shareef, Chambar road, District Tando Allahyar, Pakistan
 Markaz Islah-ul-Muslimeen, Zakariya Goth, Near Toll Plaza, Karachi, Pakistan
 Markaz Rooh-ul-Islam, Baidyan Road, Bhatta Chowk, Lahore Cantt, Pakistan
 Dargahe Tahiri - Markaz Roohul Islam, Street 20, Nasira Abad, Near Kohe Noor Mill, Rawalpindi, Pakistan ( Map)
Al Markaz Roohani Muhajir Camp, Baldia Town, Karachi

Grand Mosque Allahabad
Grand Mosque Allahabad is being under construction and it will be biggest mosque of Pakistan.

Chain of Madrasahs (Islamic schools)
There are hundreds of small and large scale madrasahs across Pakistan which come under his spiritual supervision. These free Islamic schools provide free education ranging from Nazra (recitation of Quran, the basic Islamic education) to Dars-e-Nizami (highest course of Islamic studies).

Some of them are listed below:

 Madrasah Jamiya Arabiya Ghaffariya, Dargah Allahabad Shareef, Kandiaro, Naushahro Feroze District, Pakistan. This is the central Madrasah, where most of the higher courses are taught.
 Madrasah Jamiya Ghaffariya, Dargah Faqeer Pur Shareef near Radhan City, District Dadu, Pakistan
 Jamiya Bakhshiya, Naudero, Larkana, Pakistan
 Rooh-ul-Quran, Lohar Masjid, Hyderabad, Pakistan
 Madrasah Jamiya Arabiya Tahiriya, Dargah Tahirabad Shareef, Chambar road, District Tando Allahyar, Pakistan
 Dar-ul-Fuyooz, Mohajir Camp, Karachi, Pakistan
 Noor-ul-Islam Bakhshiya Mujaddidiya, North Nazimabad, Karachi, Pakistan
 Madrasah Taleem-ul-Islam, Othal, Balochistan, Pakistan
 Madrasah Noor-e-Mustafa, Village Sorho (Taluka Pano Akil) District Sukkur, Muhtmum: Moulana Sajjad Ahmed Tahri
 Madarsa jamia Arabia Jokhia Goth Near Tollplaza Karachi, Muhtmum Molana Muhammad Ibrahim Tahiri

His prominent Khulafa (deputies)
Shaikh Muhammad Tahir Bakhshi has around three hundred Khulafa (deputies or caliphs), propagating his mission and teaching spirituality in various parts of Pakistan and abroad. Following is a short list of some of his prominent Khulafa.

 Mawlana Muhammad Rafiq Shah, Bakhshi Tahiri, grandson of the famous Naqshbandi Shaykh Fazal Ali Shah Qureshi Naqshbandi who is the 3rd grand-Caliph of Shaikh Muhammad Tahir
 Mawlana Muhammad Deedah-Dil, Tahiri, grandson of the famous Naqshbandi Shaykh Pir Mitha Naqshbandi Mujaddidi who is the grand-Caliph of Shaikh Muhammad Tahir
 Jaffer Sadiq Tahir Tahiri son of shaikh Muhammad Tahir and grandson of Sohna Saeen
 Mawlana Muhammad Jameel Abbasi Tahiri, grandson of Sohna Saeen and nephew of Shaikh Muhammad Tahir
 Haji Khair Muhammad Abbasi Tahiri, Hyderabad
 Moulana Fatehuddin soomro alias Bedar Morai, Moro, a writer and author of multiple books
 Mawlana Riasat Ali Tahiri, Sialkot
 Mawlana Syed Ismaeel Shah Tahiri, Rawalpindi. He is the founder of Dargah-e-Tahiri, a Sufi center which he founded in March 1987.
 Sayyad Muhammad Jee'al Shah Jilani, Jacobabad, Sindh. He belongs to the Jilani family, one of the highest ranked religious families in Pakistan who are descendants of Shaikh Abdul-Qadir Jilani. He has a large following in Upper Sindh and Balochistan.
 Mawlana Mufti Abdur-Rahman, Allahabad Sharif, Kandiaro, Sindh. He was first awarded Khilafat from Pir Mitha
 Khalifa Mawlana Sardar Ahmed, Bucheki Sharif, Punjab. He was first awarded Khilafat from Pir Mitha
 Mawlana Muhammad Ramzan Lakho naqshandi tahiri, karachi sindh, 
 Allama Muhammad Idrees Dahiri, Moro, who is one of the leading Islamic scholars and preachers in Sindh, and is an author of multiple books including a complete Tafsir of the Quran
 (late) Mawlana Gul Muhammad Tahiri, Bhit Shah, Sindh
 (late) Mawlana Muhammad Daud Shar-Baloch
 (late) Mawlana Haji Muhammad Ali Bozdar (d.1997) who had a large following in Lower Sindh, specially Badin and Thatta district
 Maulana Mohammad Rafiq Tahiri Sahib (Jaurah Karnana) Punjab
 Khalifa Haji Rafaqat Ali Tahiri (Karachi) Originally from Channi teeto Narowal
 Khalifa Fatehuddin Soomro (Bedar Morai), (Moro Sindh), who is Renowned Writer and is an author of fifty Five (55) books.

His Khulafa living abroad
Following is a list of his Khulafa (Deputies) living outside Pakistan.
 Khalifa Mawlana Qamar Al-Hashmi, Bakhshi Tahiri, Madinah Munawwara, Saudi Arabia
 Khalifa Zafarullah Tahiri (late), United States
 Khalifa Ghulam Shabbir Joyo Tahiri, New York City, United States
 Khalifa Mawlana Masood Tahiri, Beijing, China
 Khalifa Haji Muhammad Siddiq Sagri Tahiri, Ajman, UAE
 Khalifa Muhammad Saleem Tahiri, UAE
 Khalifa Muhammad Sultan Tahiri, UAE
 Khalifa Ahmed Hussain Tahiri, Kashmir (Pakistan), residing in UAE
 Khalifa Sayyad Ahmed Tahiri, Kashmir (India), residing in UAE
 Khalifa Nazir Ahmed Kashmiri Tahiri, Masqat, Oman
 Khalifa Muhammad Arshad Naghar Tahiri, Sydney, Australia
 Khalifa Tokeer Ahmed Tahiri, Solo, Norway

References 

Naqshbandi order
Pakistani Sufis
Pakistani Sufi saints
Sufi teachers
1963 births
Living people
Sindhi people